The 1922–23 Gold Cup was the 11th edition of the Gold Cup, a cup competition in Northern Irish football.

The tournament was won by Cliftonville for the first time.

Group standings

References

1922–23 in Northern Ireland association football